Aleksandar Živojinović,  (born 27 August 1953), known professionally as Alex Lifeson, is a Canadian musician, best known as the guitarist and backing vocalist for the rock band Rush. In 1968, Lifeson co-founded a band that would later become Rush, with drummer John Rutsey and bassist and lead vocalist Jeff Jones. Jones was replaced by Geddy Lee a month later, and Rutsey was replaced by Neil Peart in 1974. Before the band was disbanded in 2018, Lifeson was the only continuous member who stayed in Rush since its inception, and along with bass guitarist/vocalist Geddy Lee, the only member to appear on all of the band's albums.

With Rush, Lifeson played guitar, as well as other various string instruments such as mandola, mandolin, and bouzouki. He also performed backing vocals in live performances as well as the studio albums Rush (1974), Presto (1989) and Roll the Bones (1991) and occasionally played keyboards and bass pedal synthesizers. Like the other members of Rush, Lifeson performed real-time on-stage triggering of sampled instruments. Along with his bandmates Geddy Lee and Neil Peart, Lifeson was made an Officer of the Order of Canada on 9 May 1996. The trio was the first rock band to be so honoured as a group. In 2013, he was inducted with Rush into the Rock & Roll Hall of Fame. Lifeson was ranked 98th on Rolling Stone'''s list of the 100 greatest guitarists of all time and third (after Eddie Van Halen and Brian May) in a Guitar World readers' poll listing the 100 greatest guitarists.

The bulk of Lifeson's work in music has been with Rush, although Lifeson has contributed to a body of work outside the band as well. Aside from music, Lifeson has been a painter, a licensed aircraft pilot, an actor, and the former part-owner of a Toronto bar and restaurant called The Orbit Room.

Biography

Early life
Lifeson was born Alexandar Živojinović (Serbian: Александар Живојиновић) in Fernie, British Columbia. His parents, Nenad and Melanija Živojinović, were Serb immigrants from Yugoslavia. He was raised in Toronto. His stage name of "Lifeson" is a semi-literal translation of the surname Živojinović, which means "son of life" in Serbian. Lifeson's first formal music training was on the viola, which he abandoned for the guitar at the age of 12. His first guitar was a Christmas gift from his father, a six-string Kent classical acoustic which was later replaced by an electric Japanese model. During his adolescent years, he was influenced primarily by the likes of Jimi Hendrix, Pete Townshend, Jeff Beck, Eric Clapton, Jimmy Page, Steve Hackett, and Allan Holdsworth; he explained in 2011 that "Clapton's solos seemed a little easier and more approachable. I remember sitting at my record player and moving the needle back and forth to get the solo in 'Spoonful.' But there was nothing I could do with Hendrix." In 1963, Lifeson met future Rush drummer John Rutsey in school. Both interested in music, they decided to form a band. Lifeson was primarily a self-taught guitarist with the only formal instruction coming from a high school friend in 1971 who taught classical guitar lessons. This training lasted for roughly a year and a half.

Lifeson recalls what inspired him to play guitar in a 2008 interview:

Lifeson's first girlfriend, Charlene, gave birth to their eldest son, Justin, in October 1970. The couple married in 1975, and their second son, Adrian, was born two years later. Adrian is also involved in music, and performed on "At the End" and "The Big Dance" from Lifeson's 1996 solo project, Victor.

Rush

Lifeson's neighbour John Rutsey began experimenting on a rented drum kit.  In 1968, Lifeson and Rutsey formed The Projection, which disbanded few months later. In August 1968, following the recruitment of original bassist and vocalist Jeff Jones, Lifeson and Rutsey founded Rush. Geddy Lee, a high school friend of Lifeson, assumed Jones's role soon after.

Instrumentally, Lifeson is renowned for his signature riffing, electronic effects and processing, unorthodox chord structures, and the copious arsenal of equipment he has used over the years.Alex Lifeson minor overview Guitar Player Accessed 16 July 2007

Rush was on hiatus for several years starting in 1997 owing to personal tragedies in Neil Peart's life, and Lifeson had not picked up a guitar for at least a year following those events. However, after some work in his home studio and on various side projects, Lifeson returned to the studio with Rush to begin work on 2002's Vapor Trails. Vapor Trails is the first Rush album since the 1970s to lack keyboards—as such, Lifeson used over 50 different guitars in what Shawn Hammond of Guitar Player called "his most rabid and experimental playing ever." Geddy Lee was amenable to leaving keyboards off the album due in part to Lifeson's ongoing concern about their use. Lifeson's approach to the guitar tracks for the album eschewed traditional riffs and solos in favour of "tonality and harmonic quality."

During live performances, he used foot pedals to cue various synthesizer, guitar, and backing vocal effects as he played.

Victor
While the bulk of Lifeson's work in music has been with Rush, his first major outside work was his solo project, Victor, released in 1996. Victor was attributed as a self-titled work (i.e. Victor is attributed as the artist as well as the album title). This was done deliberately as an alternative to issuing the album explicitly under Lifeson's name. The title track is from the W. H. Auden poem, also entitled "Victor". Both son Adrian and wife Charlene also contributed to the album.

Side projects

Lifeson has also contributed to a body of work outside his involvement with the band in the form of instrumental contributions to other musical outfits. He made a guest appearance on the 1985 Platinum Blonde album Alien Shores performing guitar solos on the songs "Crying Over You" and "Holy Water". Later, in 1990, he appeared on Lawrence Gowan's album Lost Brotherhood to play guitar. In 1995, he guested on two tracks on Tom Cochrane's Ragged Ass Road album and then in 1996 on I Mother Earth's "Like a Girl" from the Scenery and Fish album. In 1997, he appeared on the Merry Axemas: A Guitar Christmas album. Lifeson played "The Little Drummer Boy" which was released as track 9 on the album. In 2006, Lifeson founded the Big Dirty Band, which he created for the purpose of providing original soundtrack material for Trailer Park Boys: The Movie. Lifeson jammed regularly with the Dexters (the Orbit Room house band from 1994 to 2004). Lifeson made a guest appearance on the 2007 album Fear of a Blank Planet by UK progressive rock band Porcupine Tree, contributing a solo during the song "Anesthetize". He also appeared on the 2008 album Fly Paper by Detroit progressive rockers Tiles. He plays on the track "Sacred and Mundane". Outside band related endeavours, Lifeson composed the theme for the first season of the science-fiction TV series Andromeda. He also produced three songs from the album Away from the Sun by 3 Doors Down. He was executive producer and contributor to the 2014 album "Come to Life" by Keram Malicki-Sanchez - playing guitar on the songs "Mary Magdalene", "Moving Dark Circles" and "The Devil Knows Me Well," and later on Keram's subsequent singles "Artificial Intelligence," (2019), "That Light," (2020) and "Rukh." (2021). Alex Lifeson is featured on Marco Minnemann's 2017 release Borrego, on which he played guitars on three songs and co-wrote the track "On That Note". In 2018, he played lead guitar on Fu Manchu's 18-minute mostly instrumental track "Il Mostro Atomico" from the group's Clone of the Universe album. In 2019 he was featured on the song "Charmed" from the Don Felder solo album American Rock 'n' Roll.

On 15 June 2021, Lifeson released two new instrumental songs, "Kabul Blues" and "Spy House" on his website alexlifeson.com. The songs were released as a self titled project. Andy Curran played bass on both songs, and drums on "Spy House" were done by David Quinton Steinberg.

Envy of None
The first single, "Liar", from Envy of None's debut album was released on 12 January 2022.  Envy of None consists of Lifeson, Curran, singer Maiah Wynne, and producer and engineer Alfio Annibalini.  Envy of None's self-titled debut album, which includes "Liar," "Kabul Blues," and "Spy House," was released on 8 April.

Television and film appearances
Lifeson made his film debut as himself under his birth name in the 1973 Canadian documentary film Come on Children.

He has appeared in several installments of the Canadian mockumentary franchise Trailer Park Boys. In 2003, he was featured in an episode titled "Closer to the Heart", playing a partly fictional version of himself. In the episode, he is kidnapped by Ricky and held as punishment for his inability (or refusal) to provide the main characters with free tickets to a Rush concert. In the end of the episode, Alex reconciles with the characters, and performs a duet of "Closer to the Heart" with Bubbles at the trailer park. In 2006, Lifeson appeared in Trailer Park Boys: The Movie as a traffic cop in the opening scene and in 2009 he appeared in their follow up movie, Trailer Park Boys: Countdown to Liquor Day, as an undercover vice cop in drag. In 2017, Lifeson appeared in an episode of the spin-off series Trailer Park Boys: Out of the Park: USA titled "Memphis." He also voiced Big Chunk in the first season of Trailer Park Boys: The Animated Series.

In 2008, Lifeson and the rest of Rush played "Tom Sawyer" at the end of an episode of The Colbert Report. According to Colbert, this was their first appearance on American television as a band in 33 years.

In 2009, he and the rest of the band appeared as themselves in the comedy I Love You, Man.

Lifeson appears as the border guard in the 2009 movie Suck.

Lifeson and bandmate Geddy Lee appear in the series  Chicago Fire, season 4, episode 6, called "2112", which first aired on 17 November 2015.

The role of Dr. Funtime in The Drunk and On Drugs Happy Funtime Hour was originally written with Lifeson in mind, but due to scheduling conflicts the role was given to Maury Chaykin instead.

Book forewords
Lifeson has penned forewords to four books: Behind the Stage Door by Rich Engler in 2013; Shredders!: The Oral History Of Speed Guitar (And More) by Greg Prato in 2017; Geddy Lee's Big Beautiful Book of Bass by Geddy Lee in 2018; and Domenic Troiano: His Life and Music by Mark Doble and Frank Troiano in 2021.

Legal issues
On New Year's Eve 2003, Lifeson, his son and his daughter-in-law were arrested at the Ritz-Carlton hotel in Naples, Florida. Lifeson, after intervening in an altercation between his son and police, was accused of assaulting a sheriff's deputy in what was described as a drunken brawl. In addition to suffering a broken nose at the hands of the officers, Lifeson was tased six times. His son was also tased repeatedly.

On 21 April 2005, Lifeson and his son agreed to a plea deal with the local prosecutor for the State's Attorney office to avoid jail time by pleading no contest to a first-degree misdemeanor charge of resisting arrest without violence. As part of the plea agreement, Lifeson and his son were each sentenced to 12 months of probation with the adjudication of that probation suspended. Lifeson acknowledged his subsequent legal action against both the Ritz-Carlton and the Collier County Sheriff's Office for "their incredibly discourteous, arrogant and aggressive behaviour of which I had never experienced in 30 years of travel". Although both actions were initially dismissed in April 2007, legal claims against the Ritz-Carlton were reinstated upon appeal and they were settled out of court on a confidential basis in August 2008. In his journal-based book Roadshow: Landscape with Drums – A Concert Tour by Motorcycle, Peart relates the band's perspective on the events of that New Year's Eve.

Guitar equipment

Early Rush (1970s)
In Rush's early career, Lifeson used a Gibson ES-335 for the first tour, and in 1976 bought a 1974 Gibson Les Paul; he used those two guitars until the late 1970s. He had a Fender Stratocaster with a Bill Lawrence humbucker and Floyd Rose vibrato bridge as backup "and for a different sound." For the A Farewell to Kings sessions, Lifeson began using a Gibson EDS-1275 for songs like "Xanadu" and his main guitar became a white Gibson ES-355. During this period Lifeson used Hiwatt amplifiers. He played a twelve-string Gibson B-45 on songs like "Closer to the Heart."

1980s and 1990s
From 1980 to 1986, Lifeson used four identically modified Stratocasters, all of them equipped with the Floyd Rose bridge. As a joke, he called these Hentor Sportscasters – a made-up name inspired by Peter Henderson's name, who was the producer of Grace Under Pressure. He would start using them again twenty years later. He also played a Gibson Howard Roberts Fusion and an Ovation Adamas acoustic/electric guitar. By 1987, Lifeson switched to Signature guitar despite describing them as "awful to play—very uncomfortable--...had a particular sound I liked." Lifeson primarily used PRS guitars in the later-half of the 1990 Presto tour, and again during the recording of Roll The Bones in 1990/1991. He would continue to play PRS for the next sixteen years through the recording and touring of Counterparts, Test for Echo and Vapor Trails as well as the R30 tour. During this period, he also played several Fender Telecasters.

2000s onward: Return to Gibson guitars
In 2011, Lifeson said that for the past few years he "used Gibson almost exclusively. There's nothing like having a low-slung Les Paul over my shoulder."

Gibson "Alex Lifeson Axcess"
In early 2011, Gibson introduced the "Alex Lifeson Axcess", a guitar specially designed for him. These are custom made Les Pauls with  Floyd Rose tremolo systems and piezoacoustic pick-ups. He used these two custom Les Pauls on the Time Machine Tour. These guitars are also available through Gibson, in a viceroy Brown or Crimson colour. Lifeson used these two guitars heavily on the tour.

For the 2012-2013 Clockwork Angels tour, Gibson built an Alex Lifeson Axcess model in black which became Lifeson's primary guitar for much of the show.  For all acoustic work, he played one of his Axcess guitars using the piezo pick-ups; no acoustic guitars were used at all in the Clockwork Angels show.

Paul Reed Smith acoustic signature guitar
For the 2015 R40 Tour, Lifeson used his signature acoustic guitar model by Paul Reed Smith. The guitar is currently available for private stock order.

Gibson R40 Signature Les Paul Axcess
Gibson introduced an Alex Lifeson R40 Les Paul Axcess signature guitar in June 2015.  This is a limited edition with 50 guitars signed and played by Lifeson, and another 250 available without the signature.

Gibson Custom Alex Lifeson Signature ES Les Paul semi-hollow

At the 2017 Winter NAMM Show, Gibson representative Mike Voltz introduced an Antique White Gibson Custom Alex Lifeson Signature ES Les Paul semi-hollow guitar, a hybrid of a Les Paul Custom & an ES 335, with only 200 made. Mike also introduced the Antique White as a new color from Gibson for this Custom (note: Gibson names this color as 'Classic White' on their web site which may be an error due to other Gibson reps labeling it as Antique White). Alex played this Custom on the last Rush tour.

Amplification
In 2005, Hughes & Kettner introduced an Alex Lifeson signature series amplifier; Lifeson donates his royalties from the sale of these signature models to UNICEF.

In 2012, Lifeson abandoned his signature Triamps in favour of custom-built Lerxst Omega Silver Jubilee clones, handmade by Mojotone in Burgaw, NC and Mesa/Boogie Mark V heads. He still uses the Hughes & Kettner Coreblades.

Effects
For effects, Lifeson is known to use chorus, phase shifting, delay and flanging. Throughout his career, he has used well-known pedals such as the Echoplex delay pedal, Electro-Harmonix Electric Mistress flanger, the BOSS CE-1 chorus and the Dunlop crybaby wah, among others.

Lifeson and his guitar technician Scott Appleton have discussed in interviews Lifeson's use of Fractal Audio's Axe-FX, Apple Inc.'s MainStage, and Native Instruments' Guitar Rig.

Other instruments played
Stringed instruments
In addition to acoustic and electric guitars, Lifeson has also played mandola, mandolin and bouzouki on some Rush studio albums, including Test for Echo, Vapor Trails and Snakes & Arrows. For his Victor project and Little Drummer Boy for the Merry Axemas album, he also played bass and programmed synthesizers.

Electronic instruments
During live Rush performances, Lifeson used MIDI controllers that enabled him to use his free hands and feet to trigger sounds from digital samplers and synthesizers, without taking his hands off his guitar. (Prior to this, Lifeson used Moog Taurus Bass Pedals before they were replaced by Korg MIDI pedals in the 1980s.) Lifeson and his bandmates shared a desire to accurately depict songs from their albums when playing live performances. Toward this goal, beginning in the late 1980s the band equipped their live performances with a capacious rack of samplers. The band members used these samplers in real-time to recreate the sounds of non-traditional instruments, accompaniments, vocal harmonies, and other sound "events" that are familiarly heard on the studio versions of the songs. In live performances, the band members shared duties throughout most songs, with each member triggering certain sounds with his available limbs, while playing his primary instrument(s).

Influence
Many guitarists have cited Lifeson as an influence, such as Paul Gilbert of Mr. Big, John Petrucci of Dream Theater, Steven Wilson of Porcupine Tree, Jim Martin of Faith No More, Denis "Piggy" D'Amour of Voivod, Parris Mayhew formerly of Cro-Mags, and John Wesley.

James Hetfield from Metallica named Lifeson one of the best rhythm guitarists of all time. Marillion guitarist Steve Rothery has expressed his admiration for Lifeson's "dexterity" as a live performer and described Rush as a "fantastic live band". Jazz guitarist Kurt Rosenwinkel, after citing him as an influence, praised his "incredible sound and imagination".

 Awards and honours 

 "Best Rock Talent" by Guitar for the Practicing Musician in 1983
 "Best Rock Guitarist" by Guitar Player Magazine in 1984 and May 2008
 Runner-up for "Best Rock Guitarist" in Guitar Player in 1982, 1983, 1985, 1986
 Inducted into the Guitar for the Practicing Musician Hall of Fame, 1991
 1996 – Officer of the Order of Canada, along with bandmates Geddy Lee and Neil Peart
 2007 – Main belt asteroid "(19155) Lifeson" named after Alex Lifeson
 "Best Article" for "Different Strings" in Guitar Player (September 2007 issue).
 Most Ferociously Brilliant Guitar Album (Snakes & Arrows) – Guitar Player Magazine'', May 2008
 2013 – With Rush, Rock and Roll Hall of Fame inductee

Discography

With Rush

Solo

With Envy of None 
Following Rush's dissolution in 2018 and Neil Peart's death in 2020, Lifeson formed the supergroup Envy of None with himself on guitar, mandola and banjo, Alfio Annibalini on guitar and keyboards, Andy Curran on bass, guitar and backing vocals and Maiah Wynne on lead vocals and keyboards.

Collaborations

Appearances

References

External links

Official website
Audio-Technica interview with Alex
Read 2002 CNN interview with Alex

Order of Canada citation
Lerxst Amplification
 
 

1953 births
Living people
People from the Regional District of East Kootenay
Canadian people of Serbian descent
Officers of the Order of Canada
Canadian atheists
Canadian male film actors
Canadian male television actors
Canadian male voice actors
Canadian rock guitarists
Canadian male guitarists
Canadian heavy metal guitarists
Lead guitarists
Progressive rock guitarists
Musicians from Toronto 
Rush (band) members
Anthem Records artists
Anthem Records
20th-century Canadian guitarists
21st-century Canadian guitarists
Big Dirty Band members
Envy of None members